Tomas Skogs (born February 19, 1984) is a Swedish former professional ice hockey defenceman who most notably played for Mora IK in the HockeyAllsvenskan (Allsv).

External links 
 

1984 births
Living people
Färjestad BK players
Mora IK players
Örebro HK players
Skellefteå AIK players
Swedish ice hockey defencemen
Timrå IK players